Tragidion agave is a species of beetle in the family Cerambycidae. It was described by Swift & Ray in 2008.

References

Trachyderini
Beetles described in 2008